

Postal information 
Pin Code:  413208 

Kurduvadi  is big town in Solapur district in  Maharashtra state of India. It is situated on Barshi Light Railway  It is known mainly for the railway junction connecting two different rail tracks.  Prior to gauge conversion it used to be a junction with different size gauge tracks.

Population 
Kurduwadi's population is approximately 27700.

Educational institutions

Geography
It has an average elevation of 502 metres (1646 feet).

Demographics 
 India census, Kurduvadi had a population of 22,773. Males constitute 52% of the population and females 48%. Kurduvadi has an average literacy rate of 74%, higher than the national average of 59.5%: male literacy is 80%, and female literacy is 67%. In Kurduvadi, 13% of the population was under 6 years of age.

Transport 
25 km off Mumbai Solapur Highway, Kurduwadi is accessible from Tembhurni on Mumbai Solapur Highway.Kurduwadi is known mainly for the narrow gauge railway workshop and railway junction, Kurduvadi railway station,  on Central Railway of Indian Railways.  A branch railway line takes off from Kuruvadi connecting Osmanabad and Latur towards East and Pandharpur and Miraj towards South-West.  The branch line called Barshi Light Railway was narrow gauge until 2008. Now it has been converted to broad gauge. The new broad gauge track made a detour to connect Osmanabad which was not connected by railway line.  The converted broad gauge track from Latur to Osmanabad was commissioned in September 2007 and the converted broad gauge track from Osmanabad-Barshi to Kurduvadi was commissioned in October 2008.

Kurduvadi is a railway junction where one major railway track between Wadi and Daund and a branch line track between Latur Road and Miraj intersect. The track from Daund continues to Pune and Mumbai towards west and to Manmad towards north-northwest. The branch line from Latur towards east of Kurduvadi connects Miraj in south-southwest and was called Barshi Light Railway as it was a narrow gauge track.  Solapur lies southeast of Kurduvadi and connects to Bijapur. A part of the narrow gauge Barshi Light Railway track from Kurduvadi to Pandharpur (52 km) was converted to broad gauge in 2001.  The narrow-gauge track from Pandharpur to Miraj was converted to broad gauge in 2010. The converted broad gauge track was commissioned in the last quarter of 2010 for freight trains and February 2011 for passenger trains. Now trains run on the broad gauge track from Miraj to Kurduvadi.  These include trains from Miraj to Parbhani and from Kolhapur to Solapur via Miraj. The converted Miraj-Kurduvadi railway line has shortened the railway distance between Kolhapur, Solapur and Parbhani.

References

Cities and towns in Solapur district